Results for Quarterfinals  of the 2010–11 Euroleague basketball tournament.

The quarterfinals were played from March 22 to April 6, 2011. Team #1 (i.e., the group winner in each series) hosted Games 1 and 2, plus Game 5 if necessary. Team #2 hosted Game 3, plus Game 4 if necessary.

Bracket

Team 1 hosted Games 1 and 2, plus Game 5 if necessary. Team 2 hosted Game 3, and Game 4 if necessary.

Quarterfinals

Quarterfinal 1
Game 1

Game 2

Game 3

Game 4

Quarterfinal 2
Game 1

Game 2

Game 3

Game 4

Quarterfinal  3
Game 1

Game 2

Game 3

Game 4

Game 5

Quarterfinal 4
Game 1

Game 2

Game 3

Game 4

External links
Schedule

Quarterfinals